Baetodes is a genus of mayflies in the family Baetidae. The genus contains more than 40 species.

Species (incomplete)

Baetodes adustus
Baetodes alleni
Baetodes arizonensis
Baetodes awa
Baetodes bibranchius
Baetodes caritus
Baetodes deficiens
Baetodes deludens
Baetodes diasae
Baetodes edmundsi
Baetodes fortinensis
Baetodes fuscipes
Baetodes inermis
Baetodes levis
Baetodes liviae
Baetodes longus
Baetodes noventus
Baetodes obesus
Baetodes pallidus
Baetodes pictus
Baetodes pseudospinae
Baetodes santatereza
Baetodes solus
Baetodes spinae
Baetodes tritus
Baetodes velmae

References

Mayflies
Mayfly genera